Oluwawunmi Somide Adelaja (born 16 May 1991) is a Nigerian professional footballer who plays as a forward for Biratnagar City in the Nepal Super League.

Career

Nigeria
Somide began his professional footballing career in 2005 with Nigerian club, Pepsi Football Academy. In 2007, he moved to Ebedei, with whom he played till 2008.

Moldova
He first moved out of Nigeria in 2008 to Moldova, where he signed a long-term contract with FC Olimpia Bălţi He made his Moldovan National Division debut on 28 May 2008 in a 1–0 win against Sheriff Tiraspol and scored his first goal in that match. He made 74 appearances and 34 goals from 2008 till 2012 in the Moldovan National Division 1.

India
In 2012, he moved to India, where he signed a short-term contract with Jwalandeep United Sikkim F.C. He made his Durand Cup debut on 14 September 2013 in a 3–1 victory against Assam Regiment centre, and he scored 2 goals in that match. In 2014, he signed a one-year contract with Mohammedan S.C. in the I-League 2nd division and he made his debut in a 2–0 victory against United SC. In 2015, he signed a six-month contract with Guwahati F.C. In 2016, he signed a four-month contract with East Bengal in the Calcutta Football League. His debut was against Peerless S.C. His team won the match 2–0. He also helped his club win the Calcutta football League cup 2015–16.

Nepal

Oluwawunmi Somide Adelaja joined Biratnagar City for the inaugural season of Nepal Super League 2021. He scored 5 goals in 6 games.

References

External links 
 Goal profile

1991 births
Living people
Nigerian footballers
Association football forwards
CSF Bălți players
United Sikkim F.C. players
Mohammedan SC (Kolkata) players
Tollygunge Agragami FC players
East Bengal Club players
Gokulam Kerala FC players
Manang Marshyangdi Club players
I-League 2nd Division players
I-League players
Nigerian expatriate sportspeople in Moldova
Nigerian expatriate sportspeople in India
Nigerian expatriate sportspeople in Nepal
Expatriate footballers in Moldova
Expatriate footballers in India
Expatriate footballers in Nepal
Nigerian expatriate footballers
Sportspeople from Abeokuta
Nepal Super League players
21st-century Nigerian people